New Writings in SF 18 is an anthology of science fiction short stories edited by John Carnell, the eighteenth volume in a series of thirty, of which he edited the first twenty-one. It was first published in hardcover by Dennis Dobson in June 1971, followed by a paperback edition issued by Corgi later the same year.

The book collects seven novelettes and short stories by various science fiction authors, with a foreword by Carnell.

Contents
"Foreword" (John Carnell)
"Mistress of the Mind" (Lee Harding)
"Frontier Incident" (Robert Wells)
"The Big Day" (Donald Malcolm)
"Major Operation" (James White)
"The Cyclops Patrol" (William Spencer)
"Some Dreams Come in Packages" (David A. Kyle)
"Django Maverick: 2051" (Grahame Leman)

External links

1971 anthologies
18